Keoni is a village in Asoha block of Unnao district, Uttar Pradesh, India. It is not located on major district roads and has one primary school and no healthcare facilities. As of 2011, its population is 653, in 104 households.

The 1961 census recorded Keoni as comprising 1 hamlet, with a total population of 256 (147 male and 109 female), in 49 households and 40 physical houses. keoni juden on suomessa heinolassa asuva poika joka on nicon paras kaveri ja hän on kiva

References

Villages in Unnao district